These are the current European records in the various age groups of Masters athletics, maintained by European Masters Athletics (EMA), the European Association of Masters Athletes. Starting at age 35, each age group starts on the athlete's birthday in years that are evenly divisible by 5 and extends until the next such occurrence.  For record purposes, older athletes are not included in younger age groups, except in the case of relay team members.  A relay team's age group is determined by the age of the youngest member.

Some Masters events (hurdles, throwing implements) have modified specifications. The combined events use an age-graded result applied against the standard scoring table.

Men

Key:

100 metres

200 metres

400 metres

800 metres

1500 metres

3000 metres

5000 metres

10000 metres

Marathon

3000 metres steeplechase

2000 metres steeplechase

110 metres hurdles

100 metres hurdles

80 metres hurdles

300 metres hurdles

400 metres hurdles

200 metres hurdles

High Jump

Pole Vault

Long Jump

Triple Jump

Shot Put

Discus Throw

Hammer Throw

Javelin throw

Weight Throw

Decathlon

Throws Pentathlon

5000 metres Walk Men

10 km race walk

20 km race walk

4x100 metres relay

4x400 metres relay

4x800 metres relay

Women

100 metres Women

200 metres Women

400 metres Women

800 metres Women

1500 metres Women

3000 metres Women

5000 metres Women

10000 metres Women

Marathon Women

2000 metres steeplechase Women

100 metres hurdles Women

80 metres hurdles Women

200 metres hurdles Women

400 metres hurdles Women

300 metres hurdles Women

High Jump Women

Pole Vault Women

Long Jump Women

Triple Jump Women

Shot Put Women

Discus Throw Women

Hammer Throw Women

Javelin Throw Women
Effective the 2014 season, WMA increased the weight of the javelin for women 60–75.  Until the records of the lighter implements are surpassed, two records are officially kept.

Weight Throw Women

Throws Pentathlon Women

Heptathlon Women

4x100 metres relay Women

4x400 metres relay Women

4x800 metres relay Women

5000 metres race walk Women

20 km race walk Women

Notes

See also
 List of world records in masters athletics
 United States records in masters athletics
 Italian records in masters athletics

References
General
European Masters Outdoor records 20 November 2022 updated
European Masters Outdoor Non Stadia records 29 September 2022 updated
European Masters Indoor records 31 December 2022 updated
Specific

External links
EMA web site
European records website by FIDAL
European Veterans Championships Records

masters
European